The 1998 Milan–San Remo was the 89th edition of the monument classic Milan–San Remo and was won by Erik Zabel of .

Results

1998
March 1998 sports events in Europe
1998 in road cycling
1998 in Italian sport
1998 UCI Road World Cup